The 1918 Rock Island Independents season resulted in the team posting a 5–0 record and completing shutouts in all 5 games.

Schedule

References
Pro Football Archives: 1918 Rock Island Independents season

Rock Island Independents seasons
Rock Island
Rock Island